Los Angeles Highlanders FC are an American soccer team. They play their home games at Moyse Stadium on the grounds of Glendale High School in the city of Glendale, California.

History

The Highlanders were founded in 1997 by a group of Armenian American businessmen and soccer fans as a competitive branch of the locally based Ararat Soccer Club, to compete in the nationwide amateur soccer league, the USL Premier Development League. The club rose to the pinnacle of the league quickly, becoming playoff champions in only their second season in 1998, having defeated the previously unbeaten Jackson Chargers 3–2 in the PDL Championship game and ensuring a Southwest Division champion for the third straight season.

Following the 2001 season the team ceased operations.

After a 15-year absence the club announced their return in January 2017 joining the United Premier Soccer League.

Season-by-season

References

Soccer clubs in Greater Los Angeles
Defunct Premier Development League teams
Glendale, California
1997 establishments in California
2001 disestablishments in California